The Kissing Hand is an American children's picture book written by Audrey Penn and illustrated by Ruth E. Harper and Nancy M. Leak. It features a mother raccoon comforting a child raccoon by kissing its paw.  First published by the Child Welfare League of America in 1993, it has been used "to reassure children upset by separation anxiety."

Based on a 2007 online poll, the National Education Association listed the book as one of its "Teachers' Top 100 Books for Children." It was one of the "Top 100 Picture Books" of all time in a 2012 poll by School Library Journal. It has been translated into at least five languages and has been followed by five sequels.

Background
On a train ride in Wheaton, Maryland, Penn witnessed a ritual in which a mother raccoon placed its nose on a baby raccoon's paw, and then the baby raccoon placed its paw on its own face.  The park ranger said that the purpose of the ritual was to transfer scent from the mother to the baby so that the baby could recall the mother's scent by bringing its paw to its face. Penn "started a similar ritual with her daughter — kissing her hand and telling her that whenever she was homesick, she could put her hand to her face."

Penn wrote The Kissing Hand based on the raccoons' ritual. Penn read the book at VSA arts, and  Jean Kennedy Smith wrote the book's foreword.

Summary
Chester is a young raccoon who is nervous about going to school.  His mother kisses his center palm and tells him that "whenever you feel lonely and need a little loving from home, just press your hand to your cheek and think, 'Mommy loves you. Mommy loves you.'"  Chester is comforted and goes to school.

Reception
In 1994 the book received a negative review in the School Library Journal, which considered it "marketing" for the Child Welfare League of America, with a "didactic story" and low-quality illustrations. Nevertheless, in 1998 Scholastic Corporation published a paperback version which became one of its "biggest, most popular best sellers."

The American Library Association recommended the book after the September 11 attacks of 2001. In 2004, the United States Army purchased 14,000 copies of the book for soldiers stationed abroad to read on video and transmit the video to their families at home.

It was ranked #49 in a 2007 online poll by the National Education Association of "Teachers' Top 100 Books for Children." It was ranked #95 in a list of "Top 100 Picture Books" of all time in a 2012 poll by School Library Journal.

Editions and translations
  (hardcover)
  (paperback)
  (cassette tape and paperback)
 
  (Braille)
  (CD and paperback)

Sequels

References

External links

"The Kissing Hand books: a series on life issues for children" (author's site)

1994 children's books
American picture books
Fictional raccoons
Animal tales
Wheaton, Maryland